West Hill is a village in the East Devon district of Devon, England. The village lies approximately 2 miles south west of Ottery St Mary, its nearest town. West Hill can be accessed by the nearby A30 road. The village has a primary school and a village hall, which is located by the local convenience store in the centre of the village.  Previously part of the parish of Ottery St Mary, West Hill was made into a parish in its own right in April 2017.

References

External links
 West Hill Village Web Site
 West Hill Primary School

Villages in Devon
East Devon District